The year 1972 was the 191st year of the Rattanakosin Kingdom of Thailand. It was the 27th year in the reign of King Bhumibol Adulyadej (Rama IX), and is reckoned as year 2515 in the Buddhist Era.

Incumbents
King: Bhumibol Adulyadej 
Crown Prince:
starting 28 December: Vajiralongkorn
Prime Minister:  Thanom Kittikachorn
Supreme Patriarch: 
starting 21 July: Ariyavangsagatayana VI

 
Years of the 20th century in Thailand
Thailand
Thailand
1970s in Thailand